Who's the Boss is the 2006 compilation album by St. Lunatics. A few songs on the album date back to early St. Lunatics music in 1996. The album includes appearances by all the St. Lunatics including Ali, City Spud, Kyjuan, Lil T (now Murphy Lee) & Nelly. The album was released in the United States on February 21, 2006.  The album was not released under Universal Music/Derrty Entertainment and was not supported by Nelly.  Rather, this was an album released by the owner of the original music, not endorsed by Nelly.

Track listing
 "Intro"
 "Gimme What U Got" (produced by Jason "Jay E" Epperson)
 "Sticky Now" (produced by Jason "Jay E" Epperson)
 "Ice-E" (produced by Jason "Jay E" Epperson)
 "Joyous Occasion" (produced by Lavell "City Spud" Webb)
 "Who's the Boss" (produced by Jason "Jay E" Epperson)
 "Got Myself a Date" (produced by Lavell "City Spud" Webb)
 "Check the Rhyme" (produced by Jason "Jay E" Epperson)
 "Gimme What U Got (remix)" (produced by Jason "Jay E" Epperson)
 "Tonight" (produced by Lavell "City Spud" Webb)
 "Check the Rhyme (remix)" (produced by Jason "Jay E" Epperson)

Samples
 "Gimme What U Got (Remix)" contains elements of the recording "Strawberry Letter 23" by The Brothers Johnson.
 "Who's the Boss" contains elements of the recording "Don't Look Any Further" by Dennis Edwards featuring Siedah Garrett.

References

Nelly albums
2006 compilation albums